Aaron Burr (1756–1836) was an American politician and the 3rd vice president of the United States.

Aaron Burr may also refer to:

Aaron Burr Sr. (1716–1757), American minister and educator, and the father of Aaron Burr
Aaron Columbus Burr (1808–1882), son of Aaron Burr 
Aaron Burr (advertisement), 1993 advertisement for the Got Milk? advertising campaign

See also 
Aaron (given name)
Burr (surname)
"Aaron Burr, Sir", a song from the 2015 musical Hamilton